, released as Orius in North America, is a 1991 side-scrolling shoot 'em up arcade game by Konami. It draws on Irem's R-Type and Konami's other shoot 'em up Gradius, while adding the tentacle mechanics of Irem's other shoot 'em up XMultiply. In the game, players take control of the Flintlock space fighter (which is armed with the mysterious alien life form "Flint") in a mission to rescue Princess Irene La Tias of Planet E-Square, who has been captured by the evil galactic warlord Klaus Pachelbel. 

It did not see a home port until 2007, when it was included in the compilation Salamander Portable, released only in Japan for the PlayStation Portable. In 2021, the game was released for the PlayStation 4 and Nintendo Switch in all regions as part of the Arcade Archives series, and includes all three regional variants of the game.

Gameplay 

The gameplay is similar to R-Type and X-Multiply. The player's ship, the Flintlock, has a detachable orb attachment called the Flint, which behaves similar to R-Types Force Device. Power-ups can be obtained to increase the Flint's tentacles, movement speed, change the main weapon, or even give the player an extra life or energy.

There are different gameplay mechanics between the original Japanese release and the overseas releases.  The overseas versions introduce a variety of changes, with the most notable being the removal of all but one upgradable weapon, as well as the removal of a lives system, which is replaced with an energy bar. The enemy patterns are also changed slightly and the bosses have more health.

In the Japanese version, the player starts with the Proton Laser, a thin stream of weak bullets. Defeating certain enemies will drop other weapons. The name of the current weapon is displayed at the bottom of the screen. The game uses a traditional lives system, and when a life is lost, the player continues play from a checkpoint.
In the overseas versions, the only available weapon is the Proton Laser, with Missiles acting as a secondary weapon; powering up the Proton Laser increases its spread, and powering up the Missiles increases the amount fired. The Flint's tentacles have been shortened in this version, and it now can only be shot forward and released instead of being able to be detached near the ship. This version opts for an energy bar instead of lives, and the Flintlock can take multiple hits before being destroyed. If the ship's energy reaches zero, the player must insert another credit, and then can begin immediately where they left off with a newly restored energy bar.

Plot
The game takes place in the far future, where mankind has recently developed technology allowing them to quickly travel to other planets. One day, Earth receives a telepathic distress call from Princess Irene La Tias (known as Elaine La Tias in international versions), whose home planet E-Square has been taken over by Lord Klaus Pachelbel and his bio-mechanical army. Humans soon also discover the mysterious alien life form "Flint", and quickly assemble a new space fighter, the Flintlock TMF01, that is capable of carrying the Flint with it. The Flintlock and Flint are then sent out to save Irene and her planet.

After each stage, the player is treated to a short cutscene, usually involving either Irene crying for help, or Klaus taunting the player.

Development and release 
Xexex was developed by Konami.

At the 2021 Tokyo Game Show, Hamster Corporation announced that Xexex would be re-released for the PlayStation 4 and Nintendo Switch as part of their Arcade Archives series.

Reception and legacy 

In Japan, Game Machine listed Xexex on their November 15, 1991 issue as being the fifth most-popular arcade game at the time. In the January 1992 issue of Japanese publication Micom BASIC Magazine, the game was ranked on the number ten spot in popularity. At the 1992 Gamest Awards, Xexex was awarded Best Graphics (beating Virtua Racing) and Best VGM (beating Metal Black). Xexex was also nominated for Game of the Year (ranked 4th), Best Shooter (ranked 2nd), and Best Direction (ranked 6th), but lost to Street Fighter II′: Champion Edition, Sonic Wings, and Art of Fighting, respectively.

Xexex has been met with positive reception from critics since its initial launch.

Konami released four Yu-Gi-Oh! Trading Card Game cards as a reference to Xexex; Flint, Flint Lock, Flint Attack (Flint Missile) and King of Destruction Xexex.

Notes

References

External links 
 Orius at GameFAQs
 Xexex at Killer List of Videogames
 Xexex at MobyGames

1991 video games
Arcade video games
Konami games
Konami arcade games
Horizontally scrolling shooters
Multiplayer and single-player video games
PlayStation Portable games
Science fiction video games
Video games set on fictional planets
Video games developed in Japan
Hamster Corporation games